For the 2019 Davis Cup Finals, the 18 participating nations had to submit its team nominations to the International Tennis Federation (ITF) by 29 October 2019, 20 days before the Monday of the week of the event. Teams could nominate up to 5 players, or up to 4 additional players if the captain is also listed as a player. A maximum of 3 nominated players may be changed by 11:00 CET (10:00 UTC) on 17 November 2019, the day before the first round robin match. In the event that a player on the submitted team list suffered an injury or illness prior to the start of the tournament, that player could be replaced, provided that the tournament's Independent Doctor and Referee both confirmed that the injury or illness is severe enough to prevent the player's participation in the tournament, with final discretion resting with the Davis Cup Committee. Team nominations were announced by the ITF on 21 October 2019.

The ATP ranking listed for each player is from 18 November, the Monday of the week of the Finals. Players are sorted by singles ranking, followed by doubles ranking for players without a singles ranking. Player statistics history shown covers all matches played by the players in previous Davis Cup ties before 17 November 2019, the day before the first tie of the Finals is played.

Group A

France
Captain: Sébastien Grosjean

Serbia
Captain: Nenad Zimonjić

Japan
Captain: Satoshi Iwabuchi

Group B

Croatia
Captain: Željko Krajan

Spain
Captain: Sergi Bruguera

Russia
Captain: Shamil Tarpishchev

Group C

Argentina
Captain: Gastón Gaudio

Germany
Captain: Michael Kohlmann

Chile
Captain: Nicolás Massú

Group D

Belgium
Captain: Johan Van Herck

Australia
Captain: Lleyton Hewitt

Colombia
Captain: Pablo González

Group E

Great Britain
Captain: Leon Smith

Kazakhstan
Captain: Dias Doskarayev

Netherlands
Captain: Paul Haarhuis

† Statistics shown for Jean-Julien Rojer include ties in which he played for the Netherlands Antilles team between 1998 and 2007.

Group F

United States
Captain: Mardy Fish

Italy
Captain: Corrado Barazzutti

Canada
Captain: Frank Dancevic

References

External links
Official website

Finals teams